The 2016 Townsville Blackhawks season was the second in the club's history. Coached by Kristian Woolf and co-captained by Glenn Hall and Anthony Mitchell, they compete in the Intrust Super Cup.

Season summary
The year started off on a sour note, with club captain Daniel Beasley tearing his ACL and being ruled out for the season. In his place, Glenn Hall and Anthony Mitchell were announced as co-captains of the team. Coming off a minor premiership and Grand Final appearance in 2015, the Blackhawks got off to a strong start to their second season in the Intrust Super Cup, winning their first five games. On May 19, inaugural Blackhawk Neville Costigan retired due to a chronic knee injury.

Milestones
 Round 1: Sam Foster, Sam Hoare, Delouise Hoeter, Kyle Laybutt, Willie Minoga, David Munro and Kieran Quabba made their debuts for the club.
 Round 1: Sam Hoare scored his first try for the club.
 Round 2: Delouise Hoeter scored his first try for the club.
 Round 3: Kyle Laybutt scored his first try for the club.
 Round 4: Lona Kaifoto made his debut for the club.
 Round 5: Hezron Murgha made his debut for the club.
 Round 5: Hezron Murgha scored his first try for the club.
 Round 6: Conor Carey and Brenden Santi made his debut for the club.
 Round 12: Matthew Bowen and Andrew Niemoeller made his debut for the club.
 Round 16: Davin Crampton made his debut for the club.
 Round 19: Daniel Strickland made his debut for the club.

2016 squad

Squad Movement

Gains

Losses

Fixtures

Pre-season

Regular season

Finals

Statistics

Honours

Club
Player of the Year: Jahrome Hughes
Players' Player: Corey Jensen
Back of the Year: Michael Parker-Walshe
Forward of the Year: Corey Jensen

League
Top Try Scorer: Jonathon Reuben
Fullback of the Year: Jahrome Hughes
Centre of the Year: Mosese Pangai
Second Rower of the Year: Rhyse Martin

References

2016 in Australian rugby league
2016 in rugby league by club
Townsville Blackhawks